Sooraj S. Kurup is an Indian singer, composer and actor who has composed for Malayalam films and Tamil films. He debuted as a feature film composer with the 2016 film Valleem Thetti Pulleem Thetti.

Personal life
Sooraj s Kurup was born on 10 December 1989 to Sajikumar Kurup & Satheedevi. He has a younger brother, Dheeraj S. Kurup. Sooraj Kurup married Sreevidya Balaraman on 25 January 2017.

Discography

References

External links
 

1989 births
Living people
Malayalam film score composers
Tamil film score composers